"I Heard" is a pop ballad by Hill. It is written by Deni Lew, Jamie Dornan, Pete Glenister and David Alexander for Hill's debut album Filling in the Pages. The song was released to iTunes on July 5, 2010. It reached number 1 on Brunei's Pelangi FM chart in September 2010.

Background and theme

"I Heard" is about how life gets more complicated as one grows older. The song is written in the form of questions that remain unanswered and seem less simple as time goes by.

The song was released under Sensible Records.

Music video

The single's music video, directed by Caswell Coggins, was shot in London in July 2010. It stars Hill, Kristin Kreuk, Faye Dunaway  and Paulo Rivera. The video, a tale of unrequited love, sees Hill as a stuntman for a notoriously difficult leading actor, played by Paulo Rivera, on a film shoot. He falls in love with the leading lady, played by Kristin Kreuk, but does not know how to tell her. At the end of the video, he takes his chance and gets the girl. Faye Dunaway plays the director.

Charts

References

2010 singles
Pop ballads
Hill Zaini songs
Songs written by Pete Glenister
Songs written by Deni Lew
2010 songs